Mr. ZIP, informally "Zippy", is a cartoon character used in the 1960s by the United States Post Office Department, and later by its successor, the United States Postal Service, to encourage the general public to include the ZIP Code in all mailings.

Origins
The USPS has described the origin of Mr. ZIP as follows:
Mr. ZIP was based on an original design by Howard Wilcox, son of a letter carrier and a member of the Cunningham and Walsh advertising agency, for use by a New York bank in a bank-by-mail campaign. Wilcox's design was a child-like sketch of a postman delivering a letter. The figure was used only a few times, then filed away. Later, AT&T acquired the design and made it available to the Post Office Department at no cost. ... Miami-based Post Office Department artist Joe Lawrence retained the face but sharpened the limbs and torso and added a mail bag. The new figure, who Lawrence had dubbed Mr. ZIP, was unveiled at a convention of postmasters in October 1962.

The character's original name had been Mr. P.O. Zone, but was changed to Mr. ZIP along with the new term "ZIP code."

Post Office use

The Post Office had little difficulty in getting mass mailers to use the ZIP Code as it could make its inclusion a condition for receiving preferential mailing rates and soon did. However, there was some resistance by the general public, members of whom would mail items without ZIP Code, almost invariably at the full rate for First Class Mail, which by regulation had to be delivered if at all possible and feasible. This was particularly true of older mailers. Mr. ZIP was the Post Office's answer to this, apparently intended to teach small children to always use the ZIP Code as they got older and also to encourage their parents and grandparents to do so.

Mr. ZIP is a caricature of a mail carrier, wide-eyed and drawn with his letter bag trailing him in such a way as to imply his travelling at extreme speed, and sometimes holding on to his hat with his free hand. His limbs were very thin, almost like those of a stick figure. He was particularly used on posters promoting ZIP Code use.

Mr. ZIP appeared on the selvage (non-postally valid areas) of stamp panes (more commonly called "sheets") for many stamp issues, beginning with the 5 cent Sam Houston stamp issued January 10, 1964, although the 5¢ Battle of the Wilderness stamp of May 5, 1964, is sometimes listed as the "first" because it appears earlier in most stamp catalogs due to its inclusion in a five-issue Civil War series. He also appeared on non-postally-valid labels inside, or on the cover of, stamp booklets. Stamp collectors sometimes collect the corner block of four stamps with the part of the selvage bearing Mr. ZIP; these are called "ZIP blocks". As the Post Office promoted the use of ZIP codes, Mr. ZIP was also displayed in post offices as a 4.5-foot tall plywood figure.

Mr. ZIP was featured prominently alongside the band the Swingin' Six in a televised Post Office-sponsored variety show. The songs included lyrics such as, "Meet the fellow called Mr. ZIP. What he can do for you will make you really flip. So if you have any further postal demands, we're gonna leave you in his hands."

A corresponding character named Mrs. ZIP was used in local parades and a Mrs. ZIP beauty pageant. The National Postal Museum does not have documentation about her origins.

The character was largely phased out by the late 1970s, but the Post Office retained rights to the copyrighted figure. Mr. ZIP appeared in the blank selvage of United States stamps until January 1986.

The Post Office re-introduced Mr. ZIP to stamps in 2013, celebrating the 50th anniversary of the ZIP Code system.

References

External links 
 "Swingin' Six" ZIP Code variety show video: Public Service Announcement Video produced by the Post Office Department, mid-1960s. Released online by the Smithsonian National Postal Museum.

United States Postal Service
ZIP, Mr.
ZIP code
Mascots introduced in 1962
Male characters in advertising
Postal history of the United States